First House may refer to:
First House (band), a British jazz ensemble
First House (company), a Norwegian company
First Houses, a public housing project in Manhattan in New York City
First house, an angular house in astrology